Pente Pigadia (or "Five Wells"; before 1971: Μπρίγκα - Brigka) is a settlement in the municipal unit of Filippiada in the northern part of the Preveza regional unit in Greece. It is part of the community of Kleisoura. Pente Pigadia is situated in the western foothills of the Xirovouni mountains, about 25 km north of Arta. Pente Pigadia was under Ottoman rule until the First Balkan War (1912–1913). On 21 October, 1912 (O.S.), the Battle of Pente Pigadia took place here.

Population

See also
List of settlements in the Preveza regional unit

References

Populated places in Preveza (regional unit)